McIntyre is a town in Wilkinson County, Georgia, United States. The population was 650 at the 2010 census.

History
McIntyre was founded as a depot on the Central of Georgia Railway. The community was named after Thomas McIntyre, a railroad official. The Georgia General Assembly incorporated McIntyre as a town in 1910.

Geography

Demographics

As of the census of 2000, there were 718 people, 253 households, and 180 families residing in the town. The racial makeup of the town was 57.52% African American, 36.35% White, 0.14% Native American, 2.51% from other races, and 3.48% from two or more races. Hispanic or Latino of any race were 5.29% of the population.

There were 253 households, out of which 36.8% had children under the age of 18 living with them, 38.7% were married couples living together, 23.7% had a female householder with no husband present, and 28.5% were non-families. 25.7% of all households were made up of individuals, and 11.5% had someone living alone who was 65 years of age or older.  The average household size was 2.84 and the average family size was 3.41.

In the town, the population was spread out, with 31.1% under the age of 18, 9.9% from 18 to 24, 27.4% from 25 to 44, 18.2% from 45 to 64, and 13.4% who were 65 years of age or older.  The median age was 32 years. For every 100 females, there were 98.3 males.  For every 100 females age 18 and over, there were 88.9 males.

The median income for a household in the town was $24,028, and the median income for a family was $27,321. Males had a median income of $26,667 versus $19,545 for females. The per capita income for the town was $11,485.  About 22.0% of families and 25.1% of the population were below the poverty line, including 35.3% of those under age 18 and 16.0% of those age 65 or over.

Notable people
 Kevin Brown, baseball pitcher
 Travis Jones, assistant defensive line coach for the Atlanta Falcons
Shannon family, Reality television personalities

References

Towns in Georgia (U.S. state)
Towns in Wilkinson County, Georgia